Ken Bjørntvedt Olsen (born 1 October 1967) is a retired Norwegian football striker.

From Sandefjord BK, after a spell in Danish Vejle BK he returned to Sandefjord in the summer of 1989. In 1992 he played in Eliteserien for Lyn, but returned to Sandefjord and finished his career there after it was merged to Sandefjord Fotball.

References

1967 births
Living people
People from Sandefjord
Norwegian footballers
Sandefjord BK players
Vejle Boldklub players
Lyn Fotball players
Sandefjord Fotball players
Eliteserien players
Norwegian First Division players
Association football forwards
Norwegian expatriate footballers
Expatriate men's footballers in Denmark
Norwegian expatriate sportspeople in Denmark
Sportspeople from Vestfold og Telemark